The 1998–99 season was Real Madrid's 68th season in La Liga.

Summary
Real Madrid sacked Jupp Heynckes shortly after winning the Champions League in May and hired former Valencia coach Guus Hiddink. Having come fourth in the league and achieving continental success last season, Real Madrid was considered a favorite for the 1998–99 season. There were also new arrivals such as Edgar Pacheco, Robert Jarni and Perica Ognjenović. Despite these transfers, manager Hiddink was sacked in February due to criticizing several players. Real Madrid also suffered an embarrassing Copa del Rey semi-finals exit after a 2–7 aggregate loss to eventual cup winners Valencia, as well as the Champions League quarter-finals exit against Ukrainian powerhouse Dynamo Kyiv, only winning the Intercontinental Cup that season.

Players

Squad information

Pre-season and friendlies

Reference:

Competitions

La Liga

League table

Positions by round

Matches

Copa del Rey

Round of 16

Quarter-finals

Semi-finals

UEFA Champions League

Group C

Quarter-finals

UEFA Super Cup

Intercontinental Cup

Statistics

Player statistics

References

External links
 Real Madrid 1998–99 on statto.com

Real Madrid
Real Madrid CF seasons